Horologica turrigera is a species of minute sea snail, a marine gastropod mollusc in the family Cerithiopsidae. The species was described by Watson in 1886.

References

 Cecalupo A. & Perugia I. (2013) The Cerithiopsidae (Caenogastropoda: Triphoroidea) of Espiritu Santo - Vanuatu (South Pacific Ocean). Published by the authors, Milano. 253 pp

Gastropods described in 1886
Cerithiopsidae